John Michael Beresford (born 1934) is a British retired rower who competed at the 1960 Summer Olympics.

Biography
Born in London on 23 March 1934, Beresford was educated at Bedford School.  He rowed internationally for seven years in coxed and coxless four and the men's eight. He won a European silver medal, a Commonwealth gold medal and was placed fifth in the coxless four in the 1960 Rome Olympics.

He held Olympic and European records in the coxless four and a Commonwealth Games record which stood for 28 years. He rowed at Henley Royal Regatta over a period of 13 years, being finalist in the Thames Cup, Stewards Cup, the Goblets and Grand Challenge Cup, winning the Grand once, and the Stewards twice.

He represented England and won a gold medal in the coxed four at the 1958 British Empire and Commonwealth Games in Cardiff, Wales.

He is the nephew of Jack Beresford and the grandson of Julius Beresford.  Both were Olympic rowers.

References

1934 births
English male rowers
British male rowers
Olympic rowers of Great Britain
Rowers at the 1960 Summer Olympics
Living people
Rowers from Greater London
People educated at Bedford School
Commonwealth Games medallists in rowing
Commonwealth Games gold medallists for England
Rowers at the 1958 British Empire and Commonwealth Games
European Rowing Championships medalists
Medallists at the 1958 British Empire and Commonwealth Games